Paratooite-(La) is a complex lanthanum copper(II) calcium sodium carbonate mineral, representing a unique elemental combination among the known minerals. It is a secondary, weathering mineral. There is a heterovalent diadochy substitution of lanthanum by strontium and calcium; also sodium is substituted by calcium in the mineral. Its structure proved to be more difficult to describe within the initial approach. It was later shown to be a superstructure of another rare earth carbonate mineral, carbocernaite. The "-(La)" suffix in the mineral's name is known as Levinson suffix. It refers to the particular element, of a group of elements (notably lanthanides), that dominates in the particular structural site. As such, the element would show major, dominant occupancy at this particular site.

References

Copper(II) minerals
Lanthanum minerals
Carbonate minerals
Orthorhombic minerals
Minerals in space group 55